Beachy Head is a chalk headland in East Sussex, England. It may also refer to:

 Battle of Beachy Head (disambiguation)
 RAF Beachy Head, a former Royal Air Force radar station
 MV Beachy Head, a Point-class sealift ship
 Beachy Head (poem), written in 1807 by Charlotte Turner Smith
 Beachy Head, a former name of Easyworld, a defunct British indie alternative rock/pop band
 "Beachy Head" (song), released in 2010 by the band Veronica Falls